Wörthsee is a municipality in the district of Starnberg in Bavaria, Germany.
It is located on the northeastern shore of the lake called Wörthsee, and is about 15 kilometers northwest of the county town of Starnberg.

References

Starnberg (district)